Peripatopsis lawrencei is a species of velvet worm in the Peripatopsidae family. This species has 18 pairs of legs: 17 pregenital leg pairs plus one last pair that is strongly reduced and without claws or spinous pads. This species is restricted to the Theewaterskloof-Overstrand region of South Africa.

References

Endemic fauna of South Africa
Onychophorans of temperate Africa
Onychophoran species
Animals described in 2012